James Ashton (8 May 1864 – 6 August 1939) was an Australian politician.

Born at Ashby near Geelong to coffee-roaster James Ashton and Mary Ann Kinsman Brittan, (1824-1870); he attended Sandhurst Grammar School until he left at the age of ten to work in a printing office. He moved to Echuca at the age of thirteen and then to Hay. He spent the next period working as a station agent and then as a journalist and part-owner of the Riverine Grazier. He sold his interest in 1892 and bought the Narrandera Argus. On 6 March 1899 he married Helen Willis, with whom he had four sons.

A Free Trader, he was elected to the New South Wales Legislative Assembly as the member for Hay in 1894 and re-elected in 1895. One of the major issues at the time was the question of federation and while he supported federation, he opposed the convention bill, particularly equal representation of the States in the Senate, which he thought should be proportional, that the constitution should not be amended without the support of all of the states and that a national referendum should be used to break deadlocks between the houses of parliament. Despite Ashton's opposition, the convention bill was overwhelmingly supported in his electorate. He decided to contest Goulburn at the 1898 election, where he was successful and served until 1907. He was unsuccessful as the Free Trade candidate at the 1901 election for the federal division of Riverina. The Sydney Morning Herald attributed his narrow loss to his views on federation, while his biographer Martha Rutledge attributed it in part to him expressing sympathy for the Boers in the South African War, having given a speech in parliament opposing sending NSW troops, describing it as "the wickedest war of modern times". While in parliament he studied law, passing his exams in 1902 and qualifying for the bar, but did not seek admission, deciding to continue working as a land agent.

He was appointed Secretary for Lands in the Carruthers ministry on 29 August 1904, serving until 1 October 1907. The highest profile of issues in his tenure as minister were allegations of bribery made against former minister Paddy Crick, which resulted in the appointment in 1905 of Justice William Owen to conduct a Royal Commissioner to investigate the administration of the Lands Department. The Royal Commission handed down an interim report in May 1906 and the conclusions included (i) that Crick had received corrupt payments but not any officer of the department and (ii) the administration of the Lands Department should be conducted by non-political Board of Commissioners. Crick was charged, however the jury could not agree on a verdict and Crick was ultimately expelled from parliament. Ashton attempted to implement the appointment of a Board of Commissioners, however the bill lapsed.

He retired at the 1907 election, and was appointed to the Legislative Council. He was a minister without portfolio in the Wade ministry from 2 October 1907 until he resigned with effect on 25 June 1909, due to the pressure of private business. He continued to serve on the Legislative Council until 1934 when the council was reformed by members indirectly elected by the Parliament.

His most successful investment was in 1910 with Sir Samuel McCaughey in the Coreena Pastoral Co which owned sheep and cattle stations, which Ashton attributed to putting him on Easy Street.

References

 

1864 births
1939 deaths
Free Trade Party politicians
Nationalist Party of Australia members of the Parliament of New South Wales
United Australia Party members of the Parliament of New South Wales
Members of the New South Wales Legislative Assembly
Members of the New South Wales Legislative Council
Politicians from Geelong
Australian journalists